The Canon de campagne de 80 modèle 1877 or De Bange 80mm cannon was a field artillery piece used by the French Army before and during World War I.

History
It developed in France by Colonel Charles Ragon de Bange in 1877, and adopted by the French Army that same year. It superseded the earlier Reffye cannon (1870) and the Lahitolle 95mm cannon (1875). De Bange also manufactured another cannon of a rather similar size: the De Bange 90mm cannon.

The mle 1877 was breech loading and used the original mushroom-shaped obturator system developed by de Bange, allowing to properly seal the breech during each firing. The gun lacked a recoil mechanism, meaning that it moved backward at each firing, necessitating re-aiming every time, which considerably slowed the rate of firing. This would remain a problem with all artillery pieces until the development of the hydro-peumatic recoil mechanism of the Canon de 75 in 1897.

The mle 1877 was designed to be used by horse artillery units and its light, simple and rugged construction meant it was often used as a colonial gun in France's colonial conflicts before World War I.  During World War I a number of guns were modified by removing barrels from their carriage and placing them on a simple wooden garrison mount. The guns were then placed in reinforced dugouts where they rested on a simple wooden platform that rested on an earthen berm at a +30° angle with higher angles possible by stacking wooden wedges under the barrel. A ,  or  demolition charge called a Lance Mines Gatard was loaded in the muzzle of the gun while a propelling charge was loaded in the breech. So the modified mle 1877 became a type of spigot mortar.

Gallery

Conflicts 

 Mandingo Wars
 First Madagascar expedition
 Sino-French War
 Tonkin Campaign
 First Franco-Dahomean War
 Second Franco-Dahomean War
 Franco-Siamese War
 Second Madagascar expedition
 Boxer Rebellion
 1904–1905 uprising in Madagascar
 Ouaddai War
 French conquest of Morocco
 Zaian War
 First World War

References

External links

Artillery of France
World War I guns
80 mm artillery